Universals Sports Club is a cricket ground in Harare, Zimbabwe. The ground is bordered to the north by the Louis Mountbatten School, to the east by the Rekayi Tangwena Avenue and to the west and south by open ground. Manicaland played a single List A match at the ground in the 2003/04 Faithwear Clothing Inter-Provincial One-Day Competition against Matabeleland. Rain ensured the match ended in no result, with Manicaland having reached 119/2 in their innings, with Piet Rinke and Neil Ferreira recording half centuries.

See also
List of cricket grounds in Zimbabwe

References

External links
Universals Sports Club at CricketArchive
Universals Sports Club at ESPNcricinfo

Cricket grounds in Zimbabwe
Buildings and structures in Harare